Guyalnina is a subtribe of cicadas in the family Cicadidae. It was first described by Boulard and Martinelli in 1996.

References

Fidicinini
Insect subtribes